Jean de Dieu Razafimahatratra (born 4 July 1947) is a Malagasy judoka. He competed in the men's middleweight event at the 1972 Summer Olympics.

References

1947 births
Living people
Malagasy male judoka
Olympic judoka of Madagascar
Judoka at the 1972 Summer Olympics
Place of birth missing (living people)